Huzele  (Huzeli) is a village in the administrative district of Gmina Lesko, within Lesko County, Subcarpathian Voivodeship, in south-eastern Poland. One of the oldest villages in the neighborhood of Lesko, probably founded on the Ruthenian law, mentioned in the files for the first time in 1436 under the name "Wrzele". In 1441, Małgorzata - the wife of Mościca from Wielki Koźmina, left her uncle Mikołaj Kmita and his sons Sobień (the castle) with the villages that belong to him, such as Huzele, Myczkowce, Uherce and others.
In the mid-nineteenth century, the owner of the tabular property in Huzelów was Edmund Krasicki [6].
Huzele are one of the oldest oil mining centers in the world. Oil mines existed here before 1884.
Huzele lie in the valley of the San River between the mountains of Baszta and Gruszka. About 450 residents live here. The village has numerous agritourism farms, paths that lead through the forests and meadows around. There is also a ski lift, from which you can admire the range of Słonne mountains and surrounding villages.
In the years 1975-1998 the town was administratively part of the Krosno province.
Near the road to Tarnawa Górna, about 2.5 km from the village there is a monument in honor of 115 Poles brought here from the prison in Sanok and murdered by the Nazis on Mount Gruszka in 1940.
The poet Janusz Szuber wrote a poem entitled Huzele, published in the volume of poetry Fri. Bitter provinces from 1996 [7].   .

References

Huzele